Erdem Architects (Turkish: Erdem Mimarlar) is an international architectural firm founded in 1998 by Sunay Erdem and Günay Erdem brothers  in Ankara, Turkey. Erdem Architects renders services of projects and counseling in architecture, urban planning, and landscape design.

History
Sunay Erdem  and Günay Erdem  started working together in the late 1990s. Their first major project was the proposal for Aristotelous Redesign of the Civic Axis of Thessaloniki Competition (1997). This project proposed a linear landscape structure, cutting through Thessaloniki like a knife. Erdem Architects since 90s to present designed projects to more than forty different countries, and fifty of them received awards.

Organization

Leadership
Erdem Architects leadership is organized as a collaborative partnership. Erdem Architects  current key partners are Günay Erdem and Sunay Erdem. Today, the architecture firm employs around 50 architects working on projects in more than 5 countries.

Offices
Erdem Architects maintains offices in Ankara, Istanbul and New York City.

Awards 
 Recognition Awards
 Turkish National Landscape Architecture Awards (2009, 2010 and 2013) which were given by Chamber of Landscape Architects in Turkey
 2010 Turkish National Architecture Awards and Exhibition/Category: Presentation of Ideas
 Çanakkale 18 Mart University,Success Award, Turkey, 2011
 Landscape Architecture 4 Congress, Profession Contribution Award, Turkey, 2010
 Landscape Architecture 4 Congress, International Success Award, Turkey, 2010
 TSMD Success Award, Turkey, 2010
 Chamber Of Landscape Architects, Success Awards, Turkey, 2008

 Awards in International Competitions
 La Spezia Arsenale 2062 Open Competition, Italy, Winner, 2014
 Regional Center for Educational Quality and Excellence Competition, Jubail, Saudi Arabia, 3rd Award, 2014 
 3C: Comprehensive Coastal Communities Ideas Competition, New York, USA, Wildcard Winner, 2013
 ENVISION 2040, a Green Works Orlando Design Competition, Orlando, USA, Winner, 2013
 ifac2013 International Festival of Art & Construction, Sunshade Competition, Spain, 1st Prize, 2013
  Actıvate! Desıgn Competition to Redefine Public Space in Chicago, USA Honorable Mention, 2013
 Sketch Showdown Competition, Mixed Media, Philadelphia, USA, Winner, 2013
 Art In The Plaza, Minneapolis, USA, 1st Place, 2013
  Home For Humanity Contest, San Francisco, USA, Winner, 2012 
 LifeEdited Apartment #2Challenge Competition, New York, USA, Winner, 2012
 Recconect Riverton Pedestrian Bridge, Canada, Winner, 2011
 Vancouver Viaducts & eastern core, re:CONNECT An Open Ideas Competition, Vancouver, Canada, Winner, 2011
 The Old Harbour Along With Örfirisey in Reykjavik International Competition, Reykjavik, Iceland, Winner, 2009

 Awards in National Competitions
 Elazig Education Campus, National Competition, Mention, Turkey, 2013
 Smart Sings Competition, Mention Award, Turkey, 2011 
 Zonguldak Lavuar Conservation Area And The Surrounding Urban Design Competition, Purchasing, Turkey, 2010 
 Memorial For The Sarikamis Operation National Architectural Competition, 3rd Award, Turkey, 2008 
 Adana Ziyapasa District Urban Design Competition, Purchasing, Turkey, 2008
 Maltepe Regional Park Project Competition, 3rd Award, Turkey, 2007 
 Diyarbakir Valley Landscape Planning And Urban Design Competition, 2nd Award, Turkey,  2007 
 Teos Marina, 1st Project, Turkey, 2006
 Çeşme Marina, 1st Project, Turkey, 2006 
 Kahramanmaras Town Hall Competition, 1st Purchasing, Turkey, 2006 
 Balikesir Çamlik Park National Architectural Competition, Purchasing, Turkey, 2006 
 Bursa Terminal Square National Architectural Competition, Purchasing, Turkey, 2006 
 Beylikduzu Cumhuriyet Street Design Architectural Competition, Mention, Turkey,  2006 
 Bursa Kaplikaya Valley Landscape Design Competition, Purchasing, Turkey, 2006 
 Uzundere Rekreation Valley Landscape Design Competition, 5th Mention, Turkey, 2006 
 Izmit Historical Centre Urban Renewal Design Competition, 1st Mention, Turkey, 2005 
 Van Besyol Time Square Design Competition, 3rd Award, Turkey, 2005 
 Trabzon Kalkinma Downtown Landscape Design Project, Purchasing, Turkey,  2005 
 Gaziosmanpasa City Hall And Environmental Design Competition, 2nd Award, Turkey, 2004 
  ‘Former Fiume Veneto Cotton Mill Area’ International Competition, 9th Position, Turkey, 2004 
 Izmit Basiskele Environmental Design Competition, 1st Award, Turkey, 2003 
 Pananos Beach Landscape Design Competition, Purchasing, Turkey, 2003 
 Ottoman Empire Memorial Park Competition, Purchasing, Turkey, 2002
 Damlatas Cave Restoration And Atatürk Park Competition, 1st Award, Turkey, 1999

Selected projects

Europe

Esertepe Park,  Turkey, Ankara, 2014 
Information and Communication Technologies Authority Building design  Turkey, Ankara, 2012 
 Turkish Football Federation  Riva Camp Landscape Design Project Turkey, Istanbul, 2014 
 The Old Harbour Along With Örfirisey in Reykjavik , Reykjavik, Iceland, 2009
 La Spezia Arsenale 2062, Italy, 2014
 ifac2013 International Festival of Art & Construction, Spain, 2013

North America

 3C: Comprehensive Coastal Communities, New York, USA, 2013
 ENVISION 2040, a Green Works Orlando, Orlando, USA, 2013
  Actıvate! Redefine Public Space in Chicago, USA, 2013
 Art In The Plaza, Minneapolis, USA, 2013
  Home For Humanity, San Francisco, USA, 2012 
 LifeEdited Apartment #2Challenge, New York, USA, 2012
 Recconect Riverton Pedestrian Bridge, Canada, 2011
 Vancouver Viaducts & eastern core, re:CONNECT, Vancouver, Canada, 2011

Middle-East

 Regional Center for Educational Quality and Excellence, Jubail, Saudi Arabia, 2014 

Africa

 A New Tahrir Square, Egypt, Cairo, 2011
  Urban Park Project, Libya, Sirte, 2009 
  Cultural Center Environmental Design Project, Algeria, Oran, 2006 
  Port Malabo Renewable Project, Equatorial Guinea, Malabo, 2003, Algeria, Oran, 2006 

Asia Pacific

  Re-Thinking Shanghai 2012, China, Shanghai, 2012 
  Future Living For Unstable Delta, Thailand, Bangkok, 2012 
  Housing Complex, Landscape Design Project, Russia, Moskow, 2006 
  Business Centre Design Project, Russia, Moskow, 2004
  Baku Bilgeh Estate, Azerbaijan, Baku, 2009
  Housing Complex Design Project, Turkmenistan, Ashkabat, 2001

Australia

 Green Civic Square, New Zealand, Hastings, 2012 
 Hobart Waterfront Design Project, Tasmania, Hobart, 2007

References

External links 

 Official web site 
  Archiplanet Architecture Firms in Ankara, Turkey
 Erdem Architects official Facebook page 
 Turkish architects entrusted the future of New York
 Architects Of Future
 Turkish architects design peace islands to replace La Spezia war arsenal
 Erdem Architects Gets First Prize in La Spezia Arsenale 2062 Competition 
 Identify a Public Space

Design companies established in 1998
Architecture firms of Turkey
Companies based in Istanbul
Companies based in Ankara
Turkish companies established in 1998